Algirdas Gediminas Šemeta (born 23 April 1962) is a Lithuanian economist and politician.

Biography
A native of Vilnius, Algirdas Šemeta graduated in 1985 from Vilnius University's Faculty of Economic Cybernetics and Finance with a degree as economist-mathematician. His previous position has been as Lithuania's Minister of Finance, which he fulfilled from December 2008 to June 2009, having already served in the post a decade earlier, from February 1997 to June 1999. Šemeta has minimal business experience in the private sector, his career to date has been concentrated in public office as a civil servant.

He was European Commissioner for Taxation and Customs Union, Audit and Anti-Fraud from July 2009 till November 2014. Following his Commission nomination by center-right Prime Minister Andrius Kubilius, Šemeta has affiliated himself with the European People's Party (EPP). Since December 2014 Šemeta is Business Ombudsman in Ukraine.

References

|-

|-

|-

1962 births
Homeland Union politicians
Lithuanian European Commissioners
Living people
Ministers of Finance of Lithuania
Vilnius University alumni
Ombudsmen in Ukraine